Scopula chalcographata is a moth of the family Geometridae. It is found in Egypt, the United Arab Emirates, Oman, Iran and Israel.

Subspecies
Scopula chalcographata chalcographata
Scopula chalcographata sinaica (Rebel, 1948)

References

Moths described in 1938
chalcographata
Moths of the Middle East